Condyloma (plural: "Condylomata", from Greek “kondylōma” "knuckle") refers two types of infection of the genitals:
 Condyloma acuminata, or genital warts, caused by human papilloma virus subtypes 6, 11, and others
 Condylomata lata, white lesions associated with secondary syphilis

See also
Sexually transmitted disease

External links